The Town of Moffat is a Statutory Town in Saguache County, Colorado, United States.  The town population was 116 at the 2010 United States Census.

Geography
Moffat is located at  (37.998855, -105.905973).

History
Moffat was established in 1890 by the San Luis Town and Improvement Company and initially attracted many settlers. It was a major cattle-shipping point on the narrow gauge Denver and Rio Grande Western Railroad.

The town was named after David H. Moffat, a railroad official.

Demographics

As of the census of 2000, there were 114 people, 54 households, and 30 families residing in the town. The racial makeup of the town is 89.47% White, 0.00% African American, 0.88% Native American, 0.88% from other races, and 8.77% from two or more races. Hispanic or Latino of any race were 14.91% of the population.

There were 54 households, out of which 22.2% had children under the age of 18 living with them, 44.4% were married couples living together, 9.3% had a female householder with no husband present, and 44.4% were non-families. 33.3% of all households were made up of individuals, and 11.1% had someone living alone who was 65 years of age or older. The average household size was 2.11 and the average family size was 2.70.

In the town, the population was spread out, with 21.1% under the age of 18, 6.1% from 18 to 24, 22.8% from 25 to 44, 34.2% from 45 to 64, and 15.8% who were 65 years of age or older. The median age was 45 years. For every 100 females, there were 107.3 males. For every 100 females age 18 and over, there were 100.0 males.

The median income for a household in the town was $28,906, and the median income for a family was $28,333. Males had a median income of $14,750 versus $22,083 for females. The per capita income for the town was $14,388. There were 20.0% of families and 25.2% of the population living below the poverty line, including 41.4% of under eighteens and 25.0% of those over 64.

Transportation
Moffat is part of Colorado's Bustang network. It is on the Alamosa-Pueblo Outrider line.

See also

 List of municipalities in Colorado
 San Luis Valley
 Sangre de Cristo Range

References

External links

 
 Moffat page on Sangres.Com
 Town of Moffat contacts
 CDOT map of the Town of Moffat
 Images taken from  W of Moffat, Saguache, CO, USA
 Town of Moffat on the Saguache.org website

Towns in Saguache County, Colorado
Towns in Colorado